Mario Cazes (17 July 1890 – 3 November), was a 20th-century French composer, conductor and violinist extremely popular during the 1920s and 1930s.

He was a recipient of the ordre national of the Légion d'honneur.

Marius Joseph Cazes, the son of Cazes Joseph-Auguste and Avérous Zélie, was the eldest in a family of five brothers and two sisters.

Considered one of the greatest violinists of his time, he was the first with his band to perform on Radio Tour Eiffel in 1927.

Compositions 
1924: Elle est jolie jolie (fox-trot) sung by Denantès
1924: Serenata deï Fiori (Sérénade Boston) sung by Emma Liebel
1924: Violon tzigane (Boston)
1924: Dis-moi je t'aime
1924: Miarko-Tango
1924: Mon Lulu, sung by Emma Liebel
1925: Rien qu'une nuit, "Valse Boston" sung by Georges Vorelli
1925: Sous un clair de lune (Fox-trot)
1925: Napoletana, Emma Liebel, Sonnelly, sung by Emma Liebel
1925: Noël
1926: J'ai peur de toi, 1926.
1926: Pourquoi pleurer ma mie ?, sung by Georges Vorelli, Emma Liebel
1926: Pourquoi ?, sung by Emma Liebel
1926: Un p'tit brin de muguet, "Fox Trot"
1926: Je pense à toi, sung by Mistinguett
1927: C'est l'oiseau blanc, lyrics by Didier Gold, éd. Marcel Labbé
1927: Oh ! ma poupée (Poupée d'amour) (Valse Boston), lyrics by Didier Gold, éd. Montmartre édition, sung by Emma Liebel
1927: Ne pleure pas, sung by Adolphe Bérard "FOX-BLUES"
1927: Lettre d'adieu, sung by Emma Liebel
1927: Nuits d'Orient
1927: Brûlez vos lettres d'amour (Valse Boston)
1927: Valse en sourdine, sung by Mistinguett
1928: Gustave, sung by Cairoli Porto au Cirque Médrano
1928: Peut-être, sung by Georgel
1928: Souvenir, "Chanson Slave"
1928: C'est ce soir ou jamais, sung by Mado Conti; Marcel Malloire]
1928: Ames désolées, poème lyrique by Senga in memoriam Emma Liebel
1929: Séduction, sung by Carmen Vildez, Jane Deloncle, Malloire, Annie Flore
1929: La Valse triste
1929: T'aimer, "Java-Valse"
1930: Jamais, "Modern'Valse"
1930: Folie, "Valse Moderne"
1930: Valse Boston, "Opérette MARISKA"
1930: Adoration de l'opérette Mariska, sung by Paul Gesky, Carmen Vildez, Berthe Sylva
1930: Aimer, souffrir, mourir from the operetta Mariska, sung by Berthe Sylva.
1933: Quand il viendra
1957: Avec celui qu'on aime, lyrics by Loulou Gasté), sung by Line Renaud, Franck Pourcel.

 Ton Retour, (Chantal Dorian, Jean Castillon)
 Maria-Magdalena, (Chantal Dorian, Jean Castillon)
 Près de toi, (Chantal Dorian, Jean Castillon)
 Valse à La Viennoise, performers Linette Dolmet, Lola Sernys, Regina de Bergonie, Simone Azibert
 Toi, performer Vorelli, Emma Liebel
 Il est une maison, performer Emma Liebel
 Je m'en Balance, performer Reynem
 La Valse triste, performers (Jean Cyrano, Castillon
 Rien ne vaut ta bouche, performer (Marcel Malloire
 Pour un rien, pour un mot, performers Emma Liebel, Marcel Malloire
 A Monaco, performers Carmen Vildez, Reine Chantiex, Gina Relly
 Lorsque nous serons vieux, performer Brancato, Marcel Malloire
 Neapolitan, performer Bernardo de Page.
 Mon seul amour, lyrics by Pierre Alberty
1947: Prière d'amour, lyrics by Pierre Decourt, éd. Salabert (EAS14840)

Prends-moi, Hawaï, Aux reflets de Paris, Si tu voulais, La Vira, Serment d'Amour, M'amour!M'amour!, Aux reflets de Paris, Moana, Ne faites pleurer les femmes, Pour toi, Garde-moi, Obsession, Ton bonheur, Chant des Guitares, Tout près de moi, Tu me verras passer, L'étrange Mélodie, Dans un Sourire, Valse Vache, J'suis un p'tit gosse, Chrysanthèmes, Fox trot du Canari, Je ne t'aime plus, Amour Folie, L'Écrevisse, Ma Wallonie, En Dansant Le Charl'ston, Le Chapelet d'amour, Chemineau, Petite Fumée...

Operettas 

1930 Mariska, at the Trianon Lyrique, premiered 22 December
 Text: Michel Carré, Georges Sibre, Philippe Goudard.
 Music: Cazes Mario.
 78 rpm recordings:
1931: Adoration : Berthe Sylva (song)
1931: Aimer, souffrir, mourir : Jovatti (song)
1931: Aimer, souffrir, mourir : Leone (song)
1931: Aimer, souffrir, mourir : Malloire (song)
1931: Aimer, souffrir, mourir : Berthe Sylva (song)
1931: J'ai pas voulu : Sandrey (song)
1931: Le P'tit machin : Grandini (song)
1931: Mi madre : Grandini (song)
1931: Mi madre : Jovatti (song)
1931: Mi madre : Malloire (song), Orchestre Pierre Chagnon
1931: Mi madre : Louis Zucca (song)
1931: Mi madre : Orchestre Quattrocchi
1931: Séduction : Mario Cazes (Orchestra)
1931: Un flirt : Sandrey (song)

 Text: Michel Carré, Philippe Goudard
 Music: Mario Cazes.
 78 rpm recordings:
1933: La Chanson du souvenir: Louis Zucca (song)

Cinema 
1926: La lueur dans les ténèbres, by Maurice Charmeroy.
1943: Béatrice devant le désir, by Jean de Marguenat ; music: Mario Cazes, Georges Van Parys and André Sablon, with Mario Cazes (the violinist).

External links 
 Marius Cazes on data.bnf.fr
 Béatrice devant le désir 
 Notice on Marius Cazes, with illustrations and music samples to download

French film score composers
French operetta composers
20th-century French male violinists
Recipients of the Legion of Honour
People from Béziers
1890 births
1972 deaths